Summer sausage is an American term for any sausage that can be kept without refrigeration until opened. Summer sausage is usually a mixture of pork, but may be made of or contain other meats such as beef or venison.  Summer sausage is fermented, and  can be dried or smoked, and while curing ingredients vary significantly, curing salt is almost always used. Seasonings may include mustard seeds, black pepper, garlic salt, or sugar. Fermentation of summer sausage lowers pH to slow bacterial growth and give a longer shelf life, causing a tangy taste.

Historically, summer sausage predated refrigeration and referred to meats that could be consumed "in the summer months" when high temperatures would cause fresh meats to spoil. For this reason, they became popular gifts during the winter holidays, especially in German-American settler communities.

See also

 Cervelat
 Embutido
 List of smoked foods
 Salami
 Saucisson
 Thuringer

References

American sausages
Smoked meat

cs:Uzenina